The 2019 Waverley Borough Council election took place on 2 May 2019 to elect members of Waverley Borough Council in England as one of the 2019 local elections.

Results
In the 2015 elections the Conservatives won 53 seats, the Farnham Residents Party won 3 and an Independent won the remaining seat. However, before the 2019 election the composition of the council had changed through by-elections to 50 Conservatives, 6 Farnham Residents and 1 Liberal Democrat.

|-

Following the election, a Liberal Democrat - Farnham Residents Association - Labour - Green coalition was formed, replacing the previous Conservative administration.

Cllr Paul Follows (Liberal Democrat) became leader of the council with Cllr Peter Clark (Farnham Residents Association) becoming his deputy.

Ward Results

Alford, Cranleigh Rural and Ellens Green

Blackheath and Wonersh

Bramley, Busbridge and Hascombe

Chiddingfold and Dunsfold

Cranleigh East

Cranleigh West

Elstead and Thursley

Ewhurst

Farnham Bourne

Farnham Castle

Farnham Firgrove

Farnham Hale and Heath End

Farnham Moor Park

Andy MacLeod was elected in 2015 as an Independent.

Farnham Shortheath and Boundstone

Farnham Upper Hale

Farnham Weybourne and Badshot Lea

Farnham Wrecclesham and Rowledge

Frensham, Dockenfield and Tilford

Godalming Binscombe

Godalming Central and Ockford

Godalming Charterhouse

Godalming Farncombe and Catteshall

Godalming Holloway

Haslemere Critchmere and Shottermill

Haslemere East and Grayswood

Hindhead

Milford

Shamley Green and Cranleigh North

Witley and Hambledon

By-elections

Milford

Cranleigh East

Frensham, Dockenfield & Tilford

Hindhead

Chiddingfold and Dunsfold

References

Waverley
Waverley Borough Council elections